Hurricane Alma was one of only four Atlantic tropical cyclones to reach hurricane status in the month of May. It stalled south of Cuba and deteriorated due to wind shear, and by May 22 it weakened to tropical depression status. After progressing northwestward and crossing western Cuba, Alma reorganized in the Gulf of Mexico, although continued shear prevented strengthening. It moved across Florida on May 25, and on May 27 it dissipated off the coast of Virginia.

The storm first brought gusty winds and heavy rainfall to Jamaica and the Cayman Islands. While it was weakening, Alma produced flooding in central and eastern Cuba, causing seven deaths and forcing 3,000 people to evacuate. Moderate precipitation spread across Florida, while thunderstorms from the storm caused light damage, killing one. Moisture from the storm spread up the Atlantic coast.

Meteorological history

Over the next couple of days, the depression became better organized as it moved towards the northwest; on May 19 it entered an area of favorable environmental conditions, which enabled the depression to rapidly intensify. On May 20 it strengthened into a tropical storm, at which point it was given the name Alma. That day, it rapidly strengthened under favorable developmental conditions, which included low wind shear, strong upper-level outflow, and apparent eastward inflow. It became one of only four Atlantic hurricanes on record in the month of May.

Subsequent to its peak intensity, increasing westerly shear disrupted the storm's circulation and thermal pattern, which caused rapid weakening to tropical storm strength and later tropical depression status. By May 22, the low pressure area became poorly defined after stalling south of Cuba; with only a few squalls and showers, advisories were discontinued on Alma. The remnants of Alma continued westward near the Cayman Islands, and later turned to the north, passing over western Cuba.

On May 24, the low pressure area reorganized as spiral rainbands became more evident on radar, and Alma was re-classified as a tropical depression. As the depression approached the Florida coast, radar imagery indicated the system remained well-organized, with a spiral band structure around an eye feature; however, wind shear limited convection and strength, and Alma moved ashore as a depression near Cedar Key on May 25. It turned northeastward and moved across the southeastern United States, becoming extratropical in North Carolina on May 27. After moving off the coast of Virginia, the remnants of Alma were absorbed by an approaching cold front.

Impact

Gale-force winds and heavy rainfall also occurred in Jamaica. Heavy rains ahead of the storm caused flash flooding in central and eastern Cuba. Seven people died as a result, and several homes were destroyed. The flooding forced the evacuation of 3,000 people in Oriente Province. Inclement weather closed 16 sugar mills, which stalled harvesting that was already behind schedule in the country.

In Florida, the remnants of Alma brought rainfall across most of the state, with some isolated areas experiencing  or more. The rainfall was beneficial in alleviating drought conditions, although thunderstorms caused hazardous driving conditions in the Florida Keys and elsewhere in the state. Small craft warnings were posted along the coast. One girl died from lightning in Miami, and a thunderstorm near Fort Myers damaged some roofs and outbuildings. In Saint Petersburg, flooding disrupted phonelines in about 400 households. Merritt Island experienced  wind gusts. Near Columbia, South Carolina, the remnants of Alma spawned a tornado which destroyed a roof.

See also

List of off-season Atlantic hurricanes
List of tropical cyclones
List of Atlantic hurricanes
1970 Atlantic hurricane season

References

Alma
Alma
Alma
1970 meteorology
1970 natural disasters in the United States
1970 in the Caribbean